The Motorola A780 is the second cellular PDA running the Linux operating system.

It was introduced in 2003 and sold in Europe and Asia. Some models  include GPS and navigation software.

Design
The Motorola A780 is a Linux-based smartphone. When the lid is closed, the phone appears like a traditional phone, with a keypad matrix and small display, actually a window to the larger display below the lid. When the lid is flipped open, a QVGA touch screen is revealed that can be used with fingers or a supplied stylus.

Features

The phone is supplied with a number of applications including a POP and IMAP email client, Opera web browser,  calendar and a viewer for PDF and Microsoft Office files. Calendar and address book can be synchronized with a Microsoft Exchange or SyncML server. The phone has a 1.3 megapixel camera recording still and video images. RealPlayer is included to play sound audio files and streamed audio and video. The phone has 48 megabytes of internal flash memory for storing user data and a slot for a microSD card. Both Bluetooth and USB are provided for communication with another computer. Character entry is via an on-screen QWERTY keyboard and hand writing recognition. Models including a GPS receiver are supplied with ALK Technologies' CoPilot Live  navigation software with street level maps of Europe.

Technical details
The phone has three processors: 
 Baseband Processor (BP) is an ARM7TDMI that is used for the basic GSM  phone functions. The necessary digital signal processing is performed  by an Onyx (566xx) DSP core. The BP runs the Nucleus operating system (produced by Mentor Graphics) from its own 32 MBit Flash memory.
 Application Processor (AP) is an  Intel PXA270 with an ARMv5TE ARM core. This runs Linux, the user interface Qtopia and the application programs.
 Models with GPS use a Motorola MG4100 single chip GPS receiver integrated circuit.

The Linux operating system used,  EZX Linux, is a modified version of MontaVista Consumer Electronics Linux 3.0

Linux enthusiasts

This phone is popular with Linux enthusiasts. It is able to establish a TCP/IP connection between the phone and another computer over USB or Bluetooth. One can then telnet to the phone and be presented with a bash prompt. From the prompt one can, for example, mount an NFS drive(s) on the phone. The underlying operating system, Motorola EZX is Linux based, its kernel is open source. With the source code hosted on opensource.motorola.com, it is possible to recompile and replace the kernel for this operating system. However Motorola did not publish a software development kit for native applications. Instead, they are expecting third party programs to be written in Java ME. The OpenEZX website is dedicated to providing free opensource software for this phone and others using the same OS.

See also
 Motorola
 List of Motorola products
 List of mobile phones running Linux
 OpenEZX

References

External links
 A780 entry in the OpenEZX Wiki A780 Hardware details
 Motorola Open source Makes the Linux source code and drivers available in compliance with GPL
 
 Moto4Lin file manager and "seem" (customization) editor for A780 and others
 Moto4Lin wiki A780 page at SourceForge.net
 Motorolafans fansite with many applications for Motorola Linux Phones

Motorola smartphones
Information appliances